National Highway 527 (NH 527) is a  National Highway in India.

References

National highways in India
National Highways in Bihar